William Paul Vachalan  was a bishop in the Church of South India, the second Bishop of South Kerela.

Vachalan served with the Basel Mission. He was later Principal of the Kerala United Theological Seminary at Trivandrum.

Notes

 

20th-century Anglican bishops in India
Indian bishops
Indian Christian religious leaders
Anglican bishops of South Kerala
1972 deaths